Atimoz (also Romanized as Atīmoz, Atīmaz, and Atyemaz; also known as Tīmaz) is a village in Azari Rural District, in the Central District of Esfarayen County, North Khorasan Province, Iran. At the 2006 census, its population was 1,165, in 264 families.   Atimoz is a large village located on the Road 87, south of Esfarayen city. Dowlatabad lies to the southeast.

References 

Populated places in Esfarayen County